Polar may refer to:

Geography 
Polar may refer to:
 Geographical pole, either of two fixed points on the surface of a rotating body or planet, at 90 degrees from the equator, based on the axis around which a body rotates
Polar climate, the climate common in polar regions
 Polar regions of Earth, locations within the polar circles, referred to as the Arctic and Antarctic

Places 
Polar, Wisconsin, town in Langlade County, Wisconsin, United States
Polar (community), Wisconsin, unincorporated community in Langlade County, Wisconsin, United States

People
 Polar (musician), Norwegian electronic music producer

Arts, entertainment and media

Music

Labels and studios
 Polar Music, a record label
 Polar Studios, music studio of ABBA in Sweden

Albums
 Polar (album), second album by the High Water Marks
 Polars (album), an album by the Dutch metal band, Textures

Other uses in arts, entertainment and media
Polar (webcomic), a webcomic and series of graphic novels by Víctor Santos
Polar (film), a 2019 Netflix film adaption of the above comic series

Brands and enterprises 
 Polar Air Cargo, an American airline
 Polar Airlines, a Russian airline
 Polar Beverages, an American soft drink company 
 Polar Electro, a Finnish manufacturer of sports training computers
 Sisu Polar, a truck model series produced by the Finnish heavy vehicle producer Sisu Auto

Linguistics
Grammatical polarity, a grammatical category of affirmative vs. negative
Polar question, a question that can be answered yes or no

Mathematics
Polar point group, a symmetry in geometry and crystallography
Pole and polar (a point and a line), a construction in geometry
Polar cone
Polar coordinate system, uses a central point and angles
Polar curve (a point and a curve), a generalization of a point and a line
Polar set, with respect to a bilinear pairing of vector spaces

Science and technology
Polar (cataclysmic variable), a strongly magnetic cataclysmic variable star system
Polar (satellite), a satellite launched by NASA in 1996
Chemical polarity, a concept in chemistry which describes how equally bonding electrons are shared between atoms
POLAR III and POLAR II, a pedestrian test dummy created by Honda, used to study pedestrian injuries in road traffic accidents
Polar curve (aviation), a diagram that depicts the gliding performance of an aircraft
Polar fleece, an insulating synthetic wool fabric
Polar organelle, a specialised region of the cell membrane found surrounding the flagella base(s) in some bacteria
Polar overdominance a form of genetic mutation

See also 
 
 Polarity (disambiguation)
 Polarization (disambiguation)
 Pole (disambiguation)